"Because" is a song by Irish band Boyzone, released in July 2018 as the second single from their final studio album Thank You & Goodnight, the band announced the news on their Twitter and Facebook official accounts. The song was released on 26 July 2018. The song is written by John Shanks, Boyzone-member Ronan Keating, Ed Sheeran, and Amy Wadge. Keating reached out to Sheeran who sent the track to Boyzone.

Music video
The music video for the song was released on 26 July 2018, featuring the band, karaoke singing the lyric of the song on TV, in the TV, many people sang the lyrics, British musician Ed Sheeran also made a cameo appearance in the video.

Track listing
 Digital download
 "Because" - 2:46

Release history

References

2018 singles
Boyzone songs
2018 songs
Songs written by Ronan Keating
Songs written by Ed Sheeran
Songs written by Amy Wadge
Songs written by John Shanks